The Oldenburg meteorite fell 23 km from Oldenburg, Niedersachsen, Germany on 10 September 1930, one stone falling in Bissel, the other in Beverbruch. The mass of this meteorite is 16.57kg.

See also
 Glossary of meteoritics

References

Chondrite meteorites
Meteorites found in Germany
1930 in science